Ortodossia II is an EP by the Italian punk rock band CCCP Fedeli alla linea released in 1985. It was a re-release of their first EP Ortodossia, that was released on 1984, with an additional track "Mi Ami?".

Track listing
 "Live in Pankow"
 "Mi ami?"
 "Spara Jurij"
 "Punk Islam"

Personnel
 Giovanni Lindo Ferretti - vocals
 Massimo Zamboni - guitar
 Umberto Negri - bass
 Danilo Fatur - Artista del popolo
 Annarella - Benemerita soubrette

See also
 CCCP discography
 Consorzio Suonatori Indipendenti (C.S.I.)
 Per Grazia Ricevuta (PGR)
 Punk rock

References and footnotes

External links
 Lyrics

CCCP Fedeli alla linea albums
1985 EPs